Bolama is the main town of Bolama Island and the capital of the Bolama Region. Though once the capital of Portuguese Guinea (now Guinea Bissau), it has a population of just 4,819 (2009 census) and much of its colonial era architecture is in a state of severe decay. The town is almost surrounded by mangrove swamps and is now mostly known for its production of cashew nuts.

History

Although often visited by local people, the island was apparently uninhabited in 1792 when Philip Beaver, an officer of the Royal Navy, led a failed attempt at resettling Black former slaves from the Americas on the island. Most of the settlers died and the survivors abandoned the colony in November 1793 and made their way to Settler Town in what later became the Colony of Sierra Leone. Another colonisation attempt in 1814 also failed. Nonetheless, Britain continued to press its territorial claims to the town and island, hoping to annex the region to colonial possessions in Sierra Leone. Britain formally annexed the location, making it the capital of British Guinea. This gave rise to the so-called Bolama Question, a diplomatic conflict initially raised at the Madrid conference of 1861, and dragging on until 1870 when it was eventually settled through an arbitration process overseen by United States President Ulysses S. Grant. The Portuguese negotiator, António José de Ávila, was rewarded by being declared duke of Ávila and Bolama.

In 1879, Bolama became the first capital of Portuguese Guinea and later became a logistical centre for seaplane transport. A seaplane crash in 1931 is commemorated by a statue in the town. However, a shortage of fresh water meant that Bolama could never hope to develop into a major city and on 6 December 1941 the colonial capital was moved to Bissau. Thereafter, the town of Bolama slowly fell into decay. Numerous abandoned houses now provide shelter for many thousands of enormous fruit eating bats. Every evening, these bats flock to the mainland, darkening the skies. The ruins, most notably that of the Bolama Governor's Palace, are something of a low key tourist attraction. The old colonial barracks are now used as a hospital.
A fruit processing plant was built on Bolama shortly after independence of Guinea Bissau, with Dutch foreign aid. This plant produced canned juice and jelly from cashew fruit. However, it could not expand and had to shut down its operations, due to the shortage of fresh water on the island.

Ulysses Grant Connection

A metal statue of American President Ulysses S. Grant stood in the town until August 2007 when broken up by scrap metal scavengers. Grant had chaired an international arbitration committee that, in 1870, granted Bolama to Portugal rather than to Great Britain. In gratitude, Grant's image was one of few colonial era statues to have survived into independence in the 1970s. The primary school in Bolama is still named the Ulisses Grant School in the president's honour.

Twin towns – sister cities
Bolama is twinned with:
 Faro, Portugal

Gallery

Further reading 
 The history of the English colonisation attempt in 1792 is chronicled in the first six chapters of the 2013 book, "The Ship of Death: The Voyage that Changed the Atlantic World" by (professor of history) Billy G. Smith.

References

External links 
Abolition Gone Wrong – article about the failed 1792 English settlement of Bolama

Bolama Region
Populated places in Guinea-Bissau
Populated places established in 1792
1792 establishments in the British Empire
1794 disestablishments in the British Empire
1830 establishments in Portuguese Guinea
1860 disestablishments in Portuguese Guinea
1860 establishments in the British Empire
1870 disestablishments in the British Empire
1870 establishments in Portuguese Guinea